KGEM (1140 AM) is a radio station broadcasting a religious talk format. Licensed to Boise, Idaho, United States, the station serves the Boise area. The station is currently owned by Salt & Light Radio, Inc.

Former owners Journal Broadcast Group announced July 22, 2009  that KGEM, along with sister station KCID, were to be sold to Salt & Light Radio for $950,000. The sale closed on September 25, 2009, and as a result the stations were converted to Salt & Light's local Catholic radio format (see Salt + Light Television).

See also
 KGEM-TV, Monrovia, California

References

External links
KGEM website

FCC History Cards for KGEM

GEM
Catholic radio stations